The 2014 UEFA European Under-19 Championship qualifying round was the first round of the qualification for the 2014 UEFA European Under-19 Championship final tournament. 
A total of 52 participating teams were divided into 13 groups of 4 teams, with one of the teams hosting all six group matches in a single round-robin format. The 13 group winners, 13 group runners-up and the best third-placed team secured qualification for the elite round. Hungary qualified as hosts, while Spain received a bye to the elite round as the side with the highest competition coefficient. The draw for the qualifying round was held on 5 December 2012 in Nyon. Matches were played from 6 September to 19 November 2013.

Seeding
A total of 52 participating teams were divided in two draw pots, based on the UEFA Under-19 coefficient ranking. Before the draw, UEFA confirmed that, for political reasons, Armenia and Azerbaijan would not host the mini-tournament if they were drawn in the same group, due to the dispute concerning the territory of Nagorno-Karabakh; the same rule applied for Georgia and Russia, due to the dispute regarding the territory of South Ossetia. The UEFA Executive Committee admitted Gibraltar as a provisional member of UEFA on 1 October 2012. A decision on the admission of the Gibraltar Football Association as a full member of UEFA was taken by the XXXVII Ordinary UEFA Congress in London in May 2013.

{| class="wikitable"
|-
! width=200|Pot A
! width=200|Pot B
|- style="vertical-align: top;"
|

|

Tiebreakers
If two or more teams are equal on points on completion of the group matches, the following criteria are applied to determine the rankings.
 Higher number of points obtained in the group matches played among the teams in question
 Superior goal difference from the group matches played among the teams in question
 Higher number of goals scored in the group matches played among the teams in question
 If, after applying criteria 1) to 3) to several teams, two teams still have an equal ranking, the criteria 1) to 3) will be reapplied to determine the ranking of these teams. If this procedure does not lead to a decision, criteria 5) and 6) will apply
 Results of all group matches:
 Superior goal difference
 Higher number of goals scored
 Drawing of lots
Additionally, if two teams which have the same number of points and the same number of goals scored and conceded play their last group match against each other and are still equal at the end of that match, their final rankings are determined by the penalty shoot-out and not by the criteria listed above. This procedure is applicable only if a ranking of the teams is required to determine the group winner or the runners-up and the third-placed team.

Groups
The hosts of the thirteen mini-tournament groups are indicated below in italics.

All times are CEST (UTC+02:00) until 26 October 2013 and CET (UTC+01:00) starting from 27 October 2013.

Group 1

Group 2

Group 3

Group 4

France, the reigning youth world champions having won the 2013 FIFA U-20 World Cup, failed to advance from this stage, thus also missed out on qualification to the 2015 World Cup.

Group 5

Group 6

Group 7

Group 8

Group 9

Group 10

Group 11

Group 12

Group 13

Ranking of third-placed teams
To determine the best third-ranked team from the qualifying round, only the results of the third-placed team against the winners and runners-up in each group are taken into account.

References

External links
UEFA.com

Uefa European Under-19 Football Championship Qualifying Round, 2014
Qualifying round
UEFA European Under-19 Championship qualification